Artist   is the third EP by the South Korean boy group Teen Top, released digitally on May 30, 2012 and physically on June 4, 2012 under the label of TOP Media. The lead single from the album is "To You".

Production
The EP was once again produced by Brave Brothers who also produced the group's previous work, It's early in the year.

Track listing

Chart performance

Charts

Album chart

Single chart

Sales and certifications

References

External links
"To You" music video
"To You" music video (dance version)

2012 EPs
Teen Top EPs